The  is a diesel multiple unit (DMU) train type operated by Central Japan Railway Company (JR Central) on Local, Rapid and Rapid Mie services in Japan since 1993. They were also formerly used for the Kasuga Express service until it was discontinued in March 2006.

Variants
A total of 40 cars were built, operating as 2-car sets, with the class divided into three sub-classes: KiHa 75-0/100, KiHa 75-200/300, and KiHa 75-400/500.
 KiHa 75-0/100: 6 x 2-car sets delivered June - July 1993
 KiHa 75-200/300: 8 x 2-car sets delivered February 1999
 KiHa 75-400/500: 6 x 2-car sets delivered February - March 1999, driver-only operation

KiHa 75-0 + KiHa 75-100
Twelve cars formed as six 2-car sets were delivered from Nippon Sharyo to Nagoya Depot in June and July 1993. These entered service from the start of the revised timetable on 1 August 1993 on Mie rapid services, replace ageing KiHa 58 and 65 series DMUs.

Formation

Interior
The KiHa 75-0 cars have a universal access toilet, and were also initially equipped with a card-operated payphone, but this was subsequently removed. Seating consists of transverse flip-over seats arranged 2+2 abreast.

KiHa 75-200 + KiHa 75-300

Sixteen cars formed as eight 2-car sets were delivered from Nippon Sharyo to Nagoya Depot in February 1999. These featured a number of minor changes compared with the earlier KiHa 75-0/100 sets. Externally, an additional set of headlights was included above the end gangway connections.

Formation

Interior
The KiHa 75-200 cars have a universal access toilet, and were also initially equipped with a card-operated payphone, but this was subsequently removed. The seating was the same design as that used on 313 series EMUs, still arranged in a transverse 2+2 abreast configuration.

KiHa 75-400 + KiHa 75-500

Twelve more cars formed as six 2-car sets were delivered from Nippon Sharyo to Nagoya Depot in February and March 1999. These were broadly similar to the KiHa 75-200/300 sets delivered at the same time, but were equipped for wanman driver only operation.

Formation
The KiHa 75-400/500 sets are formed as follows.

Interior
The KiHa 75-400 cars have a universal access toilet. Unlike the earlier sets, these cars were not fitted with a card-operated payphone.

References

External links

 JR Central KiHa 75 information 

75
Central Japan Railway Company
Train-related introductions in 1993
Nippon Sharyo multiple units